is a Japanese anime television series conceptualized by Manglobe and produced by Media Factory, Fuji TV, Shochiku, Yomiko Advertising and Hakuhodo DY Media Partners. It is directed by Sayo Yamamoto, with Takashi Ujita writing the scripts, Hiroshi Shimizu designing the characters and Seiki Tamura serving as art director. The music was composed by the Brazilian musician Alexandre Kassin and produced by Shinichirō Watanabe. The two eponymous starring roles are portrayed by film actresses Yōko Maki (The Grudge) and Suzuka Ohgo (Memoirs of a Geisha). It was broadcast for 22 episodes on Fuji TV's (Noise) programming block from October 2008 to March 2009. The anime is licensed by Crunchyroll in North America.

The story takes place in the fictional country of Diamandra, which has cultural traces from South American countries, mostly from Brazil. In the first episode, Michiko is introduced as a free-willed "sexy diva" who escapes from a supposedly inescapable prison fortress, while Hatchin is a girl fleeing her abusive foster family. The two join forces on an improbable escape to freedom.

Plot
In a fictional South American country, the criminal Michiko Malandro escapes from prison of Diamandra and kidnaps her former lover's daughter Hana Morenos, whom she nicknames "Hatchin", saving her from her abusive foster parents in the process. The two are about as opposite as they come, but their fates become intertwined through the connection of Hiroshi Morenos, Hatchin's father. On the run from the police and Hatchin's abusive foster family, the unlikely duo set out to find Hiroshi and ultimately discover their freedom.

Characters
 
 
 An independent woman who has just recently escaped one of the most heavily guarded prisons in existence for at least the fourth time. Michiko rescues Hatchin from her abusive foster parents and claims to know her father, who, according to her, was a good man and "made her fall in love with him right away". Both she and Hatchin embark on a journey to find him while running from the law as well. They become a bickering pair, but soon come to realize how much they truly need each other.
 
 
 A young girl who previously lived with a foster family who later earns the nickname  (or ) from Michiko. She was the victim of abuse by both parents and their two biological children, until Michiko came to her rescue. She is hesitant to trust the woman, but they share the same tattoo on their stomachs. Unlike Michiko, Hatchin is much more levelheaded and serious, often functioning as the voice of reason of the two. Despite Michiko often putting her in danger due to her destructive habits and her sometimes irrational plans, Hatchin grows to care deeply for her.
 
 
 Hatchin's father and Michiko's love from the past. Despite being officially considered dead, Michiko believes that he is alive and rescues Hatchin in order to find clues about his whereabouts. He shares the same tattoo as both Michiko and Hatchin, except on his left shoulder.
 
 
 She lived in the same orphanage as Michiko and seems to have a score to settle with her. She is now a police officer and was responsible for Michiko's arrest 12 years before the main plot. Michiko likes to call her "Jambo" (a Portuguese word for both some syzygium fruit and to refer to a dark or brown-skinned person), in order to get her angry. She seems to have mixed feelings for Michiko and is sometimes seen helping her out of a bad situation.
 
 
 An old lifelong friend of Hiroshi's who assumed control of the crime syndicate "Monstro Preto" ("Black Monster") while Michiko was behind bars. He and Hiroshi have been friends since they were children, and Hiroshi once saved his life from the original leaders of Monstro once it was discovered that Satoshi plotted to take control of the gang. Throughout the series, he is shown to be harsh, brutal and vicious, rarely showing mercy to those that have interfered with his plans. He hates Michiko, feeling that she is part of the reason that Hiroshi left and "betrayed" his friendship; much like her, he too is determined to track down Hiroshi.
 
 
 One of Satoshi's henchmen with a vicious and sadistic temper. Prior to the events of the series, he and Satoshi were close friends. He attempts to take control of Monstro by having Satoshi killed, but his betrayal is discovered leading to conflict between the two for the remainder of the series.
 
 
 A famous stripper at a local strip club. During her childhood she grew up in a fabulously wealthy family, pampered and raised like a princess until her father died and her family went bankrupt. She and her sister Lulu live with Pepê's boyfriend Rico.
 
 
 Pepê's younger sister who wears matching outfits like Pepê. She was raised by her older sister in absolute poverty after they lost their father and left their family in debt.
 
 
 Pepê's boyfriend who supports her dancing career.
 
 
 Hatchin's adoptive older sister who enjoys abusing Hatchin.
 
 
 Hatchin's adoptive younger brother who enjoys abusing Hatchin.
 
 
 Hatchin's manipulative adoptive mother. Often talks with a very formal and elegant attitude.
 
 
 Hatchin's adoptive father and a Catholic extremist who works as a priest at a local church. He and Joanna use Hatchin for the foster care money the state pays and treat her like a slave. In episode 2, he attempts to end Hatchin's life to gain insurance money while in a high speed chase alongside police.
 
 
 A young girl around Hatchin's age who performs as an acrobatic in a traveling circus along with some other children who work for the circus; she was abandoned by her parents as a baby near the circus. When she first met Hatchin, she mistook her for a boy and attempted to kiss her; she has romantic feelings for her circus partner Gino Costa.
 
 
 Rita's circus partner/love interest and a motorcyclist. Even though he tells Hatchin that he's not in love with Rita, with the simple fact that he has a long term girlfriend who is pregnant with his child, he does care about her deeply; while reassuring her that someday Rita will meet a lot of nice men and find the right boyfriend to claim as her own.  
 
 
 A nerdy-looking boy and a close friend of Rita. He is known to be a know-it-all and often get jealous when Rita starts having crushes on older men.
 
 
 The ringmaster of Circo De Chocolate-(meaning "Chocolate Circus" in Portuguese), a local circus in Perna. He has a very short stature for his age and is mostly seen wearing clown make-up and clothes. He tends to be very short-tempered and strict when it comes to the children working at the circus-(including Hatchin and Rita) and also implements hard labor onto them; Nuno is shown to be self-conscious about his height, as he had forced Gino-(who is much taller than him) to sit down when getting scolded and doesn't want Gino to look down on him. He and Madame Michiko are later revealed to be child traffickers who planned on selling Hatchin, Rita, and the rest of the orphans as slaves for child labor until Michiko catches up to them to rescue Hatchin and saving the children from an abusive fate, which eventually leads to their arrest and imprisonment. 
 
 
 An overweight woman and Nuno's assistant who takes care of the orphaned children who live at the circus.

Release
The series was produced by Manglobe and directed by Sayo Yamamoto, her first directorial work. The character designs were provided by Hiroshi Shimizu, with Shigeto Koyama designing Michiko's bike and Mariko Yamagami and Shōgo Yamazaki in charge of character fashion design. It was broadcast for 22 episodes on Fuji TV's (Noise) programming block from 16 October 2008 to 19 March 2009.

Vitello Productions and GONG produced an English dub pilot of the anime under the title Finding Paradiso, which was later used as the title for the French dub. The anime was later licensed by Funimation in North America, which produced its own English dub. The series aired on Funimation Channel in North America in November 2013, and on Adult Swim's Toonami programming block from June to December 2015. Following Sony's acquisition of Crunchyroll, the series was moved to Crunchyroll.

Episode list

Notes

References

External links
 Official site
 Official Adult Swim website
 

2009 Japanese television series endings
Adventure anime and manga
Animated duos
Anime with original screenplays
 Crunchyroll anime
Girls with guns anime and manga
Manglobe
Noise (TV programming block)
Television series set in fictional countries
Television shows set in South America
Toonami